Jayadeva (born ), also spelt Jaideva, was a Sanskrit poet during the 12th century. He is most known for his epic poem Gita Govinda which concentrates on Krishna's love with the gopi, Radha, in a rite of spring. This poem, which presents the view that Radha is greater than Krishna, is considered an important text in the Bhakti movement of Hinduism.

Little is known of his life, except that he was a loner poet and a Hindu mendicant celebrated for his poetic genius in eastern India. Jayadeva is the earliest dated author of hymns that are included the Guru Granth Sahib, the primary scripture of Sikhism – a religion founded in the Indian subcontinent centuries after his death.

Biography

A Brahmin by birth, the date and place of Jayadeva's birth are uncertain (see Jayadeva birth controversy). The Gitagovinda suggests that he was born in the "Kindubilva" village: scholars of Odisha, Bengal and Mithila have variously identified this place with a present-day village in their own region, including Kenduli Sasan near Puri in Odisha, Jaydev Kenduli in Birbhum district in West Bengal, and the village of Kenduli near Jhanjharpur  in Mithila (Bihar). Recent studies show that scholars still disagree on the issue. Jayadeva, a wanderer, probably visited Puri at some point and there, according to tradition, he married a dancer named Padmavati though that is not supported by early commentators and modern scholars.

The poet's parents were named Bhojadeva and Ramadevi. From temple inscriptions it is now known that Jayadeva received his education in Sanskrit poetry from a place called Kurmapataka, identified near Konark in Odisha.

Historical records on Jayadeva's life 
Inscriptions at Lingaraja temple, and the more recently discovered Madhukeswara temple and Simhachala temple that were read and interpreted by Padmashri Dr. Satyanarayana Rajguru have shed some light on Jayadeva's early life. These inscriptions narrate how Jayadeva had been a member of the teaching faculty of the school at Kurmapataka. He might have studied at Kurmapataka as well. It must have been right after his childhood education in Kenduli village that he left for Kurmapataka and gained experience in composing poetry, music and dancing.

Literary contributions

A few poems of Jayadeva written in archaic Odia have been published by the Directorate of Culture, Odisha. They describe the romance of Radha-Krishna and contain ideas very similar to those used in the Gita Govinda. Jayadeva is widely considered one of the earliest musicians of Odissi music. Every night during the Badasinghara or the last ritual of the Jagannatha temple of Puri, the Gitagovinda of Jayadeva is sung, set to traditional Odissi ragas & talas. This tradition has continued unbroken since the time of Jayadeva, who himself used to sing in the temple. After the time of the poet, the singing of the Gitagovinda according to the authentic Odissi ragas & talas was instated as a mandatory sevā at the temple, to be performed by the Maharis or Devadasis, systematically recorded in inscriptions, the Mādalā Pānji and other official documents that describe the functioning of the temple. To this date, the Jagannatha temple remains the fountainhead of Odissi music and the most ancient & authentic compositions (including a few archaic Odia s and s by Jayadeva himself) survive in the temple tradition, although the Devadasis are no more found owing to their systematic eradication by the British government. Two hymns of Jayadeva, have been incorporated in the Guru Granth Sahib, the holy book of the Sikh religion.

The hymns are written in a mixture of Sanskrit and eastern Apabhramsha. There are records narrating how Jayadeva's work had a profound influence on Guru Nanak during his visit to Puri.

See also

Odissi music

Sanskrit literature
Bhakta Jayadeva, 1938 and 1961 Telugu language films
 Kavi Joydev, a 1941 Bengali film about Jayadeva by Hiren Bose

Notes

References

External links

Sanskrit Scholars of Odisha (pdf)

 
Sanskrit poets
Indian male poets
Hindu poets
12th-century Indian poets
Poets from Odisha
Devotees of Jagannath
Bhakti movement
Sikh Bhagats
Odissi music composers